The Mangapōike River is a river beginning in the Gisborne Region of New Zealand's North Island.

See also
List of rivers of New Zealand

References

Rivers of the Gisborne District
Rivers of the Hawke's Bay Region
Rivers of New Zealand